European route E 711 is a European B class road in France, connecting the cities Lyon — Grenoble.

Route 
 
 E15, E70, E611 Lyon
 E712 Grenoble

External links 
 UN Economic Commission for Europe: Overall Map of E-road Network (2007)
 International E-road network

International E-road network
Roads in France